The Golden Acre is a shopping mall on the corner of Adderley and Strand Streets in downtown Cape Town.

Shopping centre
Tenants as of July 2020 include Ackermans, Shoprite and Mr Price. There are street vendors on the pedestrian bridge to Cape Town Station.

Archaeology
It was built in the 1970s by Sanlam on an old train station site. In 1975, excavations during the construction process revealed remnants of the northern portion of a storage dam built in 1663 where the coast line once was.

The 17th century Governor of the Cape Colony, Zacharias Wagenaer, was very concerned about providing regular drinking water to inhabitants and visiting ship crews alike. He ordered a rectangular masonry dam, known as the New Bowl (or also Wagener's Tank), to be built between the Fort and the ocean. Soldiers, gardeners, slaves, boys, and girls, essentially everyone in the settlement, worked to dig up and break the bedrock. Afterwards, masons finished the walls and sluices. After two months of work, the dam stretched 45 m long, 15 m wide, and 1½ m deep, storing 700,000 L of water from the Fresh River. In 1671, Wouter Mostert built a canal from the dam to the wharf to make it easier for sailors to fill the barrels at the ships rather than rolling them down the dam and on board.

The remains of the dam and canal have become a historical attraction as the Golden Acre.

References

Shopping centres in Cape Town
Archaeological sites in South Africa
Historic sites in South Africa